This is a list of the NCAA outdoor champions in the 120 yard high hurdles until 1975, with the metric 110 meters hurdles being contested in Olympic years starting in 1932.  Metrication occurred in 1976, so all subsequent championships were at the metric distance.  Hand timing was used until 1973, starting in 1974 fully automatic timing was used.  The height of the hurdles and the spacing between the two races are identical, 110 meters is 29 cm just slightly under a foot longer from the last hurdle to the finish line.

Champions
Key
y=yards
w=wind aided
A=Altitude assisted

References

GBR Athletics

External links
NCAA Division I men's outdoor track and field

Hurdles Basic NCAA Men's Division I Outdoor Track and Field Championships
NCAA Outdoor track, men
110 hurdles